Events in the year 1999 in Norway.

Incumbents
 Monarch – Harald V
 Prime Minister – Kjell Magne Bondevik (Christian Democratic Party)

Events

 1 February – The Coastal Party is founded.
 23 April – Arve Beheim Karlsen drowns in Sogndalselva
 30 September – Metropol TV starts broadcasting.
 26 November – The boat MS Sleipner collided with a rock in the notorious part of the North Sea called "Sletta", just north of the town of Haugesund. The ship sank and 16 of the people on board died.
 Saga Petroleum, Norway's third largest petroleum company, is acquired by Norsk Hydro.
 Municipal and county elections are held throughout the country.

Popular culture

Sports

Music 

 Norway in the Eurovision Song Contest 1999

Film

Literature

Television

Notable births
 

11 January – Jeanette Hegg Duestad, sport shooter.
8 February – Kristine Stavås Skistad, cross-country skier.
9 February – Henny Reistad, handball player.
16 February – Girl in Red (Marie Ulven), singer-songwriter.
28 April – Silje Opseth, ski jumper.
4 June – Aryan Tari, chess player.
16 July – Frida Maanum, footballer.
23 August – Jesper Pedersen, para-alpine skier.

Notable deaths

January
 

2 January – Aase Lionæs, politician (b.1907).
4 January – Fredrik Mellbye, physician and chief medical officer (born 1917).
12 January – Gerda Ring, actress (born 1891).
19 January – Odd Vigestad, politician (b.1915).
21 January – Magne Lystad, orienteering champion (b.1932).

February
1 February – Martin Skaaren, politician (b.1905).
8 February – Øistein Parmann, journalist and publisher (born 1921).
9 February – Bernhard Paus, orthopedic surgeon and Grand Master of the Norwegian Order of Freemasons (b.1910)
10 February – Birger Leirud, high jumper (b.1924)
13 February – Kåre Hovda, biathlete (b.1944).
26 February – Bjørn Wiik, physicist (b.1937)

March
 
 
 

7 March
 Else Granheim, librarian and civil servant (born 1926).
 Olav Hagesæther, bishop (born 1909).
14 March  
 Frithjof Jacobsen, diplomat (born 1914).
 Marius Müller, rock musician (born 1958).
16 March – 
 Trygve Bull, politician (born 1905).
 Åsta Holth, writer (born 1904).
17 March – Elling Øvergård, sport shooter (born 1947).
20 March – Grete Nash, ceramist (born 1939).
24 March – Odd Sannes, sport shooter (born 1922).
26 March  
 Olle Johan Eriksen, politician (b.1923).
 Nils O. Golten, politician (born 1936).
 Eva Kolstad, politician and Minister (b.1918).
27 March – Oskar Øksnes, politician (born 1921).
28 March – Jens Book-Jenssen, popular singer, songwriter, revue artist, and theatre director (b.1910).
29 March – Helmer Dahl, electrical engineer (born 1908).
31 March – Curt James Haydn, bobsledder (born 1919).

April
9 April – Ingolv Helland, politician (born 1906).
13 April – Knut Hauge, writer (born 1911).
14 April – Tor Bjerkmann, publisher (b. 1939). 
16 April – Osmund Faremo, politician (born 1921).
27 April – Gunnar Brunvoll, impresario and opera administrator (b. 1924).

May
4 May – Henry Tiller, boxer (born 1914).
7 May – Randi Anda, politician (b.1898).
9 May – Albert Henrik Mohn, journalist (born 1918).
25 May – Lydolf Lind Meløy, politician (born 1908).
31 May – Carl Viggo Manthey Lange, politician (b.1904).

June
 

5 June – Magne Kleiven, gymnast (born 1921).
10 June – Ingrid Øvre Wiik, actress (born 1918).
12 June – Ola Bauer, novelist and playwright (born 1943).
16 June – Thor Lund, politician (b.1921).
19 June – Karl J. Brommeland, politician (b.1913).
22 June 
 Petter Furberg, politician (b.1923).
 Eva Scheer, journalist, literary critic, translator and author (b. 1915).
25 June – Borghild Rud, illustrator (born 1910).

July
 
4 July – Georg Johansen, gymnast (born 1924).
12 July – Trond Øyen, violinist (born 1929).
20 July – Kirsten Ohm, diplomat (born 1930).
21 July – Arne Sletsjøe, violist (born 1916).
23 July – Yngvar Barda, chess player (born 1935).
26 July – Trygve Haavelmo, economist, awarded the Nobel Memorial Prize in Economic Sciences (b.1911)

August
12 August – Olav Hummelvold, politician (born 1903).
25 August – Jan Iversen, politician (b.1916).

September
7 September – Bjarne Iversen, cross country skier and Olympic silver medallist (b.1912).
13 September – Ragnar Rygel, ice hockey player (born 1930).
19 September – Kjell Kristiansen, footballer (born 1925).

October
1 October – Thore Boye, diplomat (born 1912).
5 October – Lars Breie, jurist, auditor and politician (b.1907).
6 October – Randi Kolstad, actress (born 1925).
9 October – Per Håland, newspaper editor (born 1919).
20 October – Asbjørn Skarstein, diplomat (born 1922).
24 October – Nicolai Johansen, sports official (born 1917).

November
9 November – Hersleb Vogt, diplomat (born 1912).
24 November – Per Hohle, writer (born 1918).
25 November – Oddvar Berrefjord, jurist, politician and Minister (b.1918).

December
 
 
8 December 
 Bjarne Flem, politician (b.1914).
 Kjell Moe, international footballer (b.1909)
11 December – Oddleif Fagerheim, politician (b.1911).
21 December – Elsa Rastad Bråten, politician (b.1918).
22 December – Per Aabel, comic actor (b.1902).
23 December – Valter Gabrielsen, politician (b.1921).
25 December – Arne Ileby, footballer (born 1913).
26 December 
 Wilhelm Aarek, philologist and educationalist (born 1907).
 Ola Skjåk Bræk, banker, politician and Minister (b.1912).
28 December – Dagmar Lahlum, resistance member and agent (born 1923).
30 December – Kjølv Egeland, politician (b.1918).
31 December 
 Ferdinand Finne, artist (b.1910).
 Johannes Seland, politician (b.1912).

Full date unknown
Erling Anger, civil servant (b.1909)
Karl Olsen, civil servant (b.1910)
Hans Skjervheim, philosopher (b.1926)

See also

References

External links

 
Norway